The Hershey Lodge and Convention Center is a hotel and convention center located in Hershey, Pennsylvania. It has 665 guest rooms and 100,000 square feet of function space. Its meeting and exhibit space consists of the Great American and Confection Halls along with the Chocolate and Cocoa Ballrooms. It is located between and near U.S. Routes 322 and 422.

References

External links
  (archived, 8 Mar 2021)

Buildings and structures in Dauphin County, Pennsylvania
Convention centers in Pennsylvania
Hershey Entertainment and Resorts Company
Hotels in Pennsylvania